Shaukat Fakirbhai Dukanwala (born 21 January 1957) is an Indian-born cricketer who played for the United Arab Emirates national cricket team. He played five One Day Internationals for United Arab Emirates and was a member of 1996 Cricket World Cup team.

External links

1957 births
Living people
Emirati cricketers
United Arab Emirates One Day International cricketers
Indian cricketers
Baroda cricketers
Indian emigrants to the United Arab Emirates
Indian expatriate sportspeople in the United Arab Emirates
Cricketers from Mumbai